Sodium bromite is a sodium salt of bromous acid. Its trihydrous form has been isolated in crystal form. It is used by the textile refining industry as a desizing agent for oxidative starch removal.

References

Bromites
Sodium compounds